ARTV is a private owned cable TV channel of Chile. It mostly airs cultural programming, such as the popular TV shows Endogao, Muchachas, and Caracas.

See also List of Chilean television channels

External links
Official website Last retrieved on October 15, 2012

Television networks in Chile
ARTV
Spanish-language television stations
Television channels and stations established in 1992
Companies based in Santiago